Yellow Boogie & Blues is a studio album by American R&B and Boogie-woogie pianist and vocalist Little Willie Littlefield.

Content
The album was recorded in August 1994 at The Farmsound Studio in Heelsum in the Netherlands and released in 1994 on the Dutch record label Oldie Blues (OLCD 7006). The album was produced by Job Zomer.

Track listing
 "Everyday I Have the Blues"
 "New Orleans Blues"
 "Goodmorning Judge"
 "The Last Date"
 "Do You Want to Boogie"
 "Georgia on My Mind"
 "Rancho Grande"
 "Lowdown Shame"
 "Me and My Bobby McGee"
 "Pinetop's Boogie Woogie"
 "Stormy Monday Blues"
 "Rocking Chair Boogie"
 "Chief and Job Blues"
 "Rockin' the Blues"
 "Gonna Tell My Mama"
 "Lucky Old Sun"
 "Trembling"
 "Wampie Blues"
 "Those Kansas City Nights"

Personnel
 Little Willie Littlefield - piano, vocals
 Job Zomer - clarinet, sax and drums
 Michael Burger - double bass and electric bass

References

Little Willie Littlefield albums
Oldie Blues albums
1994 albums